Màquina! (also Máquina!) was a Spanish prog rock and psychedelic rock group from Barcelona. It was formed in 1969 and disbanded in 1972. They were pioneers of progressive rock in Catalonia and Spain and their first album Why? is widely considered one of the most memorable Spanish prog rock albums from the 70s.

Overview
Máquina has its origins as a backing band called La Companyia, SL for singers and groups of the musical folk association Grup de Folk in 1968, collaborating with Jaume Sisa, Pau Riba, Miniatura and others. Grup de Folk disappeared as an association in 1968. After that, two of its members, Jordi Batiste and Enric Herrera, decided to electrify themselves and swap into rock music in 1969.

This bunch of Catalan youngsters led by the Batiste-Herrera tandem became soon the most prominent and visible heads of the grassroots movement which shake the foundations of the city's musical world at the beginning of the seventies and which can be considered as the parting shot for progressive rock in Spain.

Their first EP Lands of Perfection was released in August 1969 with Jordi Batiste (bass, lead vocals), Enric Herrera (hammond, piano, back vocals), Luigi Cabanach (guitar, back vocals) and Jackie García (drums). Their second Ep Earth's Daughter, was released at the end of the same year with a new drummer, Tapi Vilaseca.

Why?, their debut album (1970, also known as the "croissant" LP) is widely regarded in and out of Spain as one of the best records ever to come out of Spain. A wah wah, fuzz & hammond feast by this talented  pioneering crew. It was recorded by Jordi Batiste (bass, lead vocals, flute), Enric Herrera (Hammond, keyboard, piano), Luigi Cabanach (guitar, bass, back vocals), Tapi Vilaseca (drums) and Josep Maria París (guitar). Batiste had to left the band before finishing the album to join the army in the compulsory military service that in those years lasted around 15 months. París came as his replacement but it was Cabanach who got Batiste's role singing and playing the bass while París became the lead guitarist. The only song in which the five musicians play together is in Why?. Maquina! never was a five-piece band. In September of the same year, Enric Herrera also had to leave the band for military service and Maquina! played for a while months as a trio. Keyboardist Álvaro Is, a friend of París, joined the band to play Herrera's part. In January 1971, Luigi Cabanach left the band to do the military service leaving the band without any of their original members in the line-up. Soon after, Álvaro Is left the band to play in Sweden. Being reduced to two members, París decided to give up the band and come back to Sweden, where he used to live before joining Maquina! Tapi would then make a new band (Tapiman) to play the gigs previously booked to Maquina.

In early 1971, Enric Herrera, while doing the military service, decide to redo the band and try some different styles. The new line-up included three teenagers from the band Crac that refused a contract to make their first album to join Enric Herrera in his new project. The other members were constantly changing, except the German saxophonist Peter Rohr. Jordi Batiste declined to join the new line-up. They added the new influences of jazz-rock, blues, soul and funk to their style and the four-piece band became an eight-piece with brass players. One of the new members was a 16 years old Carles Benavent. This change was inspired by the success of bands as Blood, Sweat and Tears and Chicago Transit Authority. Maquina! might also be considered the first jazz-rock band in Catalonia and Spain. Their second and last LP, En directo, was recorded as a live concert in July 1972 with the collaboration of founder member Jordi Batiste as a singer.

Discography 
Why? (1970)
En directo (Live, 1972)
Funciona (Archival, 1982)

References

External links
Page on discogs.com

Musical groups established in 1969
Spanish progressive rock groups
Musical groups disestablished in 1972